One of the Georgia incumbents was re-elected and the other lost.

See also 
 List of United States representatives from Georgia
 United States House of Representatives elections, 1794 and 1795

1794
Georgia
United States House of Representatives